Ernst Scheufele (died 2010) was a Luftwaffe fighter ace during World War II, attached to JG 5. He was credited with 18 victories. He flew 67 escort missions for German Bismark-class battleships and German Tirpitz-class Battleships.

References

German World War II flying aces
2010 deaths